Apoyando ("supporting") is a method of plucking used in both classical guitar and flamenco guitar known in English as 'rest stroke'.  Rest stroke gets its name because after plucking the string, the finger rests on the adjacent string after it follows through, giving a slightly rounder, often punchier sound (contrasted with tirando).  

Classical guitar
Flamenco
Guitar performance techniques

ru:Гитара#Звукоизвлечение